Gregory Lewis Burson (June 29, 1949 – July 22, 2008) was an American voice actor. He was best known as a replacement for voice actors Daws Butler and Mel Blanc following their deaths in 1988 and 1989, respectively.

Career
Burson was trained by Daws Butler, who was his acting mentor and one of his influences. Following Butler's death, Burson inherited most of his characters, starting with Yogi Bear on The New Yogi Bear Show and many other characters in Hanna-Barbera-related shows. He also inherited the role of Mr. Magoo in the animated segments of the live action feature film of the same name in 1997 (after Jim Backus died in 1989).

Burson was also a voice replacement for Mel Blanc, and voiced many of his characters as well, including Bugs Bunny, for whom he was given the responsibility of voicing in 1995's Carrotblanca, a well-received 8-minute Looney Tunes cartoon originally shown in cinemas alongside The Amazing Panda Adventure (USA and Canada) and The Pebble and the Penguin (non-US). It has since then released on video, packaged with older Looney Tunes cartoons, and was even included in the special edition DVD release of Casablanca, of which it is both a parody and a homage. 

Burson also voiced Bugs in the 1997 short From Hare to Eternity, which is notable for being dedicated to Friz Freleng (who had died in 1995). It was also notable for being the final Looney Tunes cartoon that Chuck Jones had directed before his death in 2002. Burson also provided Bugs' voice in new animation for The Bugs and Daffy Show, which ran on Cartoon Network from 1996 to 2003. Alternating with Jeff Bergman, Bob Bergen, Joe Alaskey, Jim Cummings, Maurice LaMarche, and Billy West, he also voiced several other Looney Tunes characters including Daffy Duck, Porky Pig, Tweety, Sylvester, Elmer Fudd, Yosemite Sam, Marvin the Martian, Tasmanian Devil, Pepé Le Pew, Speedy Gonzales, and Foghorn Leghorn on various Warner Bros. animated television series, films, toys, and video games.

His other voice work includes shows such as CatDog, Batman: The Animated Series, All-New Dennis the Menace, Mother Goose and Grimm, The Angry Beavers, Johnny Bravo, Samurai Jack, The Smurfs, Super Friends, The Twisted Tales of Felix the Cat and Garfield and Friends, the feature film Jurassic Park and the three Star Wars video games The Phantom Menace, Jedi Power Battles, and The Gungan Frontier.

In 1995, at the height of popularity of R. L. Stine's Goosebumps book and television series, though not known at the time, and his only performance in it, he was also the voice behind one version of the commercial that promoted the "Goosebumps Fan Club" in some of the old VHS tapes of the TV show of the same name, while Tony Jay recorded a second version of the same promo. Burson also lent his voice to several promos for Fox Kids.

Legal issues
In May 2004, Burson's career came to an end when he was arrested by detectives after barricading himself inside his home in Tujunga for six hours before surrendering. Initial reports claimed that an armed S.W.A.T. team had responded to a call from two of his female roommates that he was drunk, armed and holding a third female roommate hostage. Burson also screamed a stream of nonsensical words at the police when they were alerted to his home. Officers later discovered that Burson had a collection of guns in his home. One officer said, "He was so drunk, we couldn't tell if he was trying to do one of his voices or was just slurring his words." Officer Rudy Villarreal confirmed that all three women involved in the incident lived with Burson, but none of them were harmed. The incident caused Burson to be blacklisted for the rest of his life.

Death
Burson died at the age of 59 due to complications from diabetes and arteriosclerosis on July 22, 2008. He had been struggling with alcoholism in the later part of his life due to being depressed from losing voice-over work. He was survived by his two sons and his brother.

Filmography

Film

Television

Video games

Theme parks

References

External links
 

1949 births
2008 deaths
20th-century American male actors
21st-century American male actors
American male voice actors
American male video game actors
Deaths from diabetes
Hanna-Barbera people
Male actors from Los Angeles